James Robert Blewett (born August 26, 1980) is a NASCAR Whelen Modified Tour driver. He is the younger brother of the late John Blewett III.

Early career
At 14 years of age, Blewett started racing karts at New Egypt Speedway and Flemington Speedway. At 18, he moved up into a Pro Stock (Now Sportsman) race car at Wall Township Speedway. The following year he moved up a class again, this time into Modifieds. His car displayed the number 76, the same number that had belonged to his father, John Jr. His first win in modifieds came seven days before his 20th birthday.

2001: Showtime Mania
Blewett's racing started at a high note, by winning Opening Night at Wall, that placed him on top of the points. He lost the points lead at least three times One: black flagged for rough riding, Two: involved in a minor accident, and Three: Smashed in the rear at a double points event which was a 76 lapper. Fans, Family, Friends and himself felt that his hopes of winning the track title were over but, they were not disappointed for long. The next week after losing valuable points from the 76 lapper, John III (Blewett's brother) wrecks Harry Reed (who replaced Blewett in the top spot after the 76 lapper) from the competition, and that opened the door to Blewett, and he regained the top spot for the remainder of the season, and on September 29, 2001 Blewett won his first Wall Township Speedway Title by defeating Harry Reed and multi time track titlist Dave Michel in tow. At Turkey Derby, Blewett won two out of the three features, and his hopes of winning overall went up in smoke when he tangled with fellow competitor, Tim Arre. Brother John won the overall title which was his second.

2002
Blewett returned to Wall as the defending champion. Blewett started to gain more confidence in his career by winning the 76-lapper (leading all 76 laps), the Garden State Classic (100 laps), and the Sunoco 150, which was a Tour Type Modified race which was an upset over track regular Ken Woolley, Jr., Tour Type Regular George Kent (who was DQ'ed after finish), and John III (moved to third in the finish) was a Tour regular.

On October 26, 2002, Blewett won his second Track Title. The 29th Annual Turkey Derby which Blewett nearly won, which was the Tour Type Modified event which his car had worn tires that forced his car to spin out of control. After the spin, Blewett backed into Ken Woolley, Jr. (who led most of the race) in anger, and Blewett clawed his way back to finish a respectable third behind 1981 Champion Jamie Tomaino, and Ken Woolley, Jr (won the event).

The next day was a damp one. The Small Block Modified feature event, which became a fiasco to all race fans. The race was scheduled to be 150 laps, the cars pit for 75 laps, and return to the track for another 75 laps. The race was cut short at 75 laps, due to off and on rain so Blewett ended up in sixth place, and brother John in second.

2003
Blewett has 2 cars for that season, one was silver and the other was black and white, and a tour car. Blewett made his tour debut at the now closed Nazareth Speedway and qualified ninth in the 40 car field. His day ended on lap 58, after crashing into the retaining wall, and finished a dismal 34th. A race or two later, he raced at his home track which was the inaugural event at Wall. Blewett finished a respectable fourth behind 1990 Tour Champion Jamie Tomaino, Ken Woolley, Jr., and his brother won the race. Blewett and his brother John split a victory which was THE GARDEN STATE CLASSIC which was twin 50's from the original 100 lap format. On October 15, 2003 Blewett finished a very respectable second in points to Dave Michel. At the Turkey Derby, Blewett won two out of the three events, and captured the Overall Title by a single margin.

2004: Showtime Mania Meltdown
2004 was the start of a difficult year for Blewett. Opening Night at Wall, he was suspended due to verbal abuse to an official. A week after, he returned and scored a top five finish, week after that, won a race. Everything was going well, and made up the points that he missed from Opening Night, put him on top. On July 3, 2004 things started coming to a head. After the tire scuffle for the start of the 76 lap event, Harry Reed drove into the back of Blewett (who was outside of John III in front). Blewett pitted his damaged car before the green fell, and Reed never returned to action. While John III, was holding a healthy lead, Blewett returned to the race with 11 laps off the pace. While Blewett's grandfather John Sr. advised him to stay last because, the points were the important thing to score. Suddenly, Blewett furiously veered right into Steven Reed (Harry's son) sending him airborne, and sliding across the speedway. Officials immediately disqualified him from the contest and he received no points, and when he drove into the pits, Reed's crew and Blewett's crew started throwing punches at each other along with pushing and shoving. Jessie (Blewett's stepmother), and father John, Jr. shielded Blewett's crippled car, and almost the whole crowd rioted into the pits. Finally, Blewett was taken back to his home by Wall Township Police officers after the fights subsided. John won the race and he stated during his interview, "fighting, doesn't sugar coat anything."

Later, Blewett received a four-week suspension and the hopes of winning a third title were over. That was when Showtime Mania was falling apart.

During those weeks, he raced at Chemung and won a couple of races there. A month and a half later, Blewett returned to Wall and raced the Garden State Classic, and finished 13th because the car overheated. Unfortunately, Blewett finished 11th in points, and he put that regular season behind him, but he won the Turkey Derby in a 100 lap event, along with his brother who won the 125 lap Tour Type Event.

2005
Blewett only ran 2 Wall events until he was hired for a ride at the Riverhead Raceway. Car Owner, Edward Partridge hired Blewett to race his Modified for weekly action at Riverhead. Blewett scored 2 wins, and finished a remarkable 8th in points. Also, capturing the Rookie of the Year honor. Not only Blewett had those accomplishments, he went on to race at other tracks such as Thompson International Speedway, and Stafford Motor Speedway in an SK Modified, and a handful of NASCAR Whelen Modified Tour events. Turkey Derby XXXII, Blewett competed both classes Tour Type Modified (Finished 6th), won two out of the three Small Block Modified events, and lost the crown narrowly to Street Stock track king Rich Mongeau.

2006
Blewett decided to race the NASCAR Whelen Modified Tour for a full season. Not only the tour, he went to compete at Thompson and Stafford in the SK circuit. Prior to those events, Blewett headed down to New Symrna Speedway in Florida which was a ten night race. While there, he picked up a few victories which includes the Richie Evans Memorial (100 Laps), and won the SK Modified Title by one point after apparent winner Tommy Farrell III ended up a close second after a score protest. At the Icebreaker at Thompson, Blewett finished in the top 10 in the first SK race. In the second on Sunday, he ended up on two wreckers. In the Tour event, he finished in the top twenty while fighting an ill handling car. At the Spring Sizzler, in the SK event Blewett was removed from competition by slowing the race down three times. Tour event, ended up in the back of the wall with a dead battery, after completing 150 out of the scheduled 200 lap event.

Returning to Wall, Blewett won Opening Night, and John followed him in second. Blewett only raced a handful of races at Wall because he was competing mostly on the Tour. In September of that season, Blewett won his first ever Tour event at Martinsville Speedway in Virginia. When the tour ended, Blewett finished 15th in the points with one win.

At Turkey Derby XXXIII, Blewett led the last 29 laps in the Tour Type Modified event, until a driver from the Connecticut area came out of nowhere, and tried to pass Blewett for the win but, two laps left Blewett pinched him in the wall, and Blewett won the race and he was showered with Bronx cheers because the fans in the stands did not like the way he won. Finally, Blewett ignored the fans' displeasure, while he was being interviewed, after that rough event.

2007
2007 was the year that changed the lives of Blewett, his family, friends, and fans, forever.

On August 16, 2007, during a NASCAR Whelen Modified Tour event at Thompson, Blewett and his elder brother John III were battling for the lead starting on lap 83. On lap 107, the unthinkable happened; Blewett's car got out of shape, and John III tried to avoid and Blewett's car ended on top of John's car. Immediately, Blewett exited his crippled car unscathed, peeked into John's window and then he frantically summoned to the safety crew and immediately rushed to the scene. The capacity crowd, was silent while looking at the horrific site. At 11:00 pm, Blewett received the grim news, John died - he was 33 years old.

The next day, Blewett held a two-day vigil at his home along with his family, friends, and fans all over.

That Saturday, Wall Township Speedway held a special memorial service for John. Blewett handed out his speech to the somber crowd "He was a brother, friend, and mentor who helped me over the years, and I miss you brother". Prior to that horrific event, Blewett accomplished his second SK title at New Symrna, and 2 wins at Wall. At the North South Shootout in North Carolina Blewett won the SK event in the car that John raced weekly at Thompson, and he stated in his interview, "That was my brother's car". In the tour type event, with the car was painted red, white, and blue with No. 76 in John's honor, the car spun in the front stretch while running in the top 5 and finished a disappointing 14th.

In Turkey Dweby XXXIV, Blewett finished second in the Tour Type Modified race after being involved in an early nasty crash, and taking multiple trips to the pit area. Blewett drove John's No. 76 in the small block modified event. Blewett was fighting hard to get to the front by pounding repeatedly onto two-time track champion Kevin Flockhart, and it ended up with a spin. Blewett took the top spot while Kevin pitted for a fresher tire. Blewett was holding onto a comfortable lead until Kevin furiously clamped onto Blewett's rear bumper. On lap 74, Kevin hooked onto Blewett's right rear bumper sending them two into the wall, Blewett's accident was violent, and a brawl broke out. Blewett was escorted off the property by Wall Officers. After that season, Blewett finished 8th in the tour points with one win.

2008
Blewett started off his third full season on the Tour, and racing weekly at Thompson and Stafford. Blewett win his third straight SK Modified Title along with the Tour Type Modified title, he also won the inaugural John Blewett III Memorial (50 Laps) which was an emotional victory for him.

Blewett, this time piloting the George Bierce, owned No. 19 on the tour. Not only Blewett races the tour and SK events he ran a handful of True Value Modified, and All Star Events. Blewett won another Memorial race at Riverhead Raceway which was called "Tom Baldwin, Charlie Jarzombek, and Richie Evans Memorial" it was a 77 lapper. That was the night after he won at Stafford Motor Speedway in the tour race after apparent winner Ryan Preece was penalized for rough riding. It was Blewett's first top five finish after his two previous visits 1: went airborne into the wall on lap 179, 2: DQ'ed from fifth place after an altered carburetor.

His next stop was Riverhead, and won that as well. Blewett missed two SK races that season because, he suffered a hand injury while working at the junkyard that was owned by his grandfather.

North South Shootout: Blewett finished second in the SK Modified event behind Tour Champion Ted Christopher. In the Tour Type Modified event, Blewett started seventh in the race. At approximately 20 laps Blewett drove into the lead but it did not last long before NC local and eventual winner Burt Myers passed. On the restart, Blewett went out of shape and ended up in the front straight away wall, and that ended his night on lap 45. Blewett was interviewed and stated that the shifter broke. In the final results, he ended up a lackluster 26th.

Turkey Derby XXXV: Blewett wins the Tour Type Modified race which marked his second win in that division along with two small block modified titles in that race. In the small block event, Blewett led much of the race until he pitted for tires on lap 68. Blewett was put to the rear for rough riding, during the race. Blewett raced back into second, chasing Tour fellow Rowan Pennick, and raced bumper to bumper, and Blewett attempted to pass his car spun after exiting turn one. After that race was over, Blewett finished fourth which was respectable, and Rowan won the event. Blewett finished ninth in the tour points with 2 victories.

2009
Blewett, returned to the Edward Partridge owned No. 12 for the NASCAR Whelen Modified Tour and, a handful of SK Modified events.

Blewett, wins the SK Modified championship for the fourth consecutive time, at New Smyrna Speedway by winning all eight events, and a single Tour Type win, and ended up fourth in the points.

Blewett will be returning to Wall Township Speedway, if his tour schedule would conflict. Especially, it might conflict his tour schedule. Blewett captured the 100 Lap Victory in the 59th Opening Edition at the renamed Wall Stadium since 2001. Blewett won his 30th career Modified main event in the Race of Champions 100 lap race. He drew the pole from a blind draw, and held off NASCAR Whelen Modified Tour fellow Tony Ferrante, Jr. The Twin 30 event, was not a good sign when Blewett severely damaged his car, in qualifying it was damaged enough to put it on the sidelines, and Blewett jumped into Stu Paer's No. 2 for the two features, finishing a very respectable second, and crashed out in the second credited a lackluster 12th.

Blewett, finished a close second in the NASCAR Whelen Modified Tour behind reigning champion Ted Christopher. Blewett ran, the SK Modifieds fifth on Saturday, and did not start the Sunday event due to mechanical failure. At the Spring Sizzler, Blewett finished a very respectable ninth in the 200 lap contest. Not only racing the event, he finished third in the SK Modified event. Blewett, captured the TSI Harley Davidson Classic at Stafford Motor Speedway leading all 100 laps holding off Ted Christopher. That win, marked his second Stafford tour win since, August 2008. Blewett, started 18th at New Hampshire International Speedway and his hopes of grabbing another remarkable finish were dashed, when he was involved in a mix up with other competitors when the green flag came out, and Blewett ended up on a back of a wrecker and finished a disappointing 28th in the final rundown. Spencer Speedway, dropped out with a broken suspension and ended up in 22nd.

Blewett, returned to Wall on July 18 for the 49th edition Garden State Classic. Qualified second behind eventual winner, and longtime rival Steven Reed. Redrew eighth, and clipped Tim Arre's battered car and was eliminated for the night. A week later, Blewett visited victory lane for the fourth time this season, after a previous week after nearly destroyed his racer that was worth $10,000 in damage.

Blewett, finished a very remarkable 8th at the Town Fair Tire 150, at Stafford Motor Speedway. Blewett ran the twin 50's at Wall Stadium by finishing second in the first, and won the second.

Blewett's hopes of getting a remarkable finish at Thompson, was washed out due to inclement weather, and it's rescheduled on September, 3rd. Two nights later, he won the inaugural John Blewett III Memorial 76 Lap event at Wall Stadium. Blewett, started outside pole after a blind draw, and jumped into the lead, and never looked back. The win was dedicated, to his late brother who died two summers ago, at the Thompson International Speedway during the NASCAR Whelen Modified Tour event, and Blewett was involved in that harrowing accident.

Blewett, ran the inaugural event at Bristol Motor Speedway. Started 11th, and his day was not promising, as he had struggled to speed throughout the event, with a bad vibration and it was forced on the sideline on lap 74.

An announcement was made on August 31, that Blewett parted ways with TS Hauler on the NASCAR Whelen Modified tour, and car owner Edward Partridge said that the split was amicable, and Blewett to focus on family and business commitments. Finally, Partridge has chosen Keith Rocco (Whelen Modified Tour) and Ronnie Silk (SK Modified) as Blewett's replacements for the remainder of the 2009 season.

Blewett, raced the season finale at Wall Township Speedway, and did not finish the event after being involved in an incident.

On the Tommy Comerford Memorial, Blewett qualified second place, and started seventh from a blind draw. Blewett, made multiple trips to the pits for adjustments, and after half way he was on a mission. Blewett, won the first event, and his day ended early in the second event with a punctured radiator.

The 36th Annual Turkey Derby, Blewett qualified the pole for the SK Modified, and fourth in the Tour Type Modified. In the Tour Type, Blewett was black flagged for leaking fluid less than 10 to go while leading. Blewett, rebounded in the SK with a win.

Blewett's plans for 2010, will be racing the Dick Barney No. 14 for selected events on the NASCAR Whelen Modified Tour.

2010
Blewett decided not to race at Wall Stadium for the 2010 year because he had a heated argument with the tracks promoter over "SPEC ENGINES". Longtime rival Steven Reed purchased a motor from Tom Martino. The ridiculous horsepower that this motor made had caused his departure.  This ended up being unfounded though, as Chas Okerson won the division running the old style motor, and the 2011 season proved that it was a moot point, as drivers won with both Spec's and the old motors.

Blewett found himself a new home at New Egypt Speedway, which is a dirt track and races in the sportsman division.
He drove the Dick Barney famed No. 14 for selected events on the NASCAR Whelen Modified Tour.

Just three days after his thirtieth birthday, Blewett won his first dirt race and broke track record. Blewett won the Tour Type Modified race at Turkey Derby.

2011
Blewett, moved to the Big Block Modified at New Egypt. Currently racing the Dick Barney No. 14, for selected tour events. Unfortunately, the season of the tour was a huge disappointment. During the season, he decided to end his partnership with Barney after, two season. However, the parties remained friends.

Blewett, returned to Wall since Turkey Derby racing the 76 lapper, in honor of his late brother, and won the event. At Turkey Derby, he swept the events in Tour Type and SK.

2012
Blewett ran eight NASCAR Whelen Modified Tour events in his family owned No. 76. In his off time he was back at the New Egypt Speedway. Blewett raced Thompson, and finished fourth on the tour. It was his first top 5 finish since 2010. Blewett finished eighth in points.

2013
Blewett ran eight events on the NASCAR Whelen Modified Tour. He won three events which were New Egypt, Bridgeport (twice), and Wall.

2014
Blewett, raced a full year of dirt and finished fifth in the points at New Egypt Speedway along with a victory. He capped the year off at Wall Stadium, Turkey Derby.

2015
Blewett, missed three events at New Egypt Speedway which was due to his flip in June. He came back in July and won at New Egypt 4 July weekend. He won the Woody's 105 at Wall Stadium. After the regular season ended at New Egypt, Blewett decided to sell his dirt equipment and return to his roots on asphalt for the 2016 season. Blewett raced the Ole Blue No. 3 at the NorthSouth Shootout at Caraway Speedway, finishing 10th. He ran the Trukey Derby at Wall Stadium Winning the Dirt Modified and SK Modified feature, and a DNF in the Tour Mod Race.

2016
After a three year absence from the tour, Blewett was offered a Tour ride in the Bob Garbarino No. 4 and, Starrett Tools as the sponsor. Blewett finished sixth in the final points, with one win. Not only racing on the tour, he returned to Wall Stadium on his off nights, winning three times. He raced four divisions at Turkey Derby, winning two out of the four. Winning the 45, out of the scheduled 50 lap Sportsman event due to time constraints in his Nephew John IV's No. 5 that he intends to drive in 2017. He successfully repeated his Dirt Modified title along with two top five finishes in the SK/Wall (Second) and Tour (Third). After the season concluded, Blewett won't be racing the Mystic Missile for 2017.

2017
Blewett raced on the NASCAR Whelen Modified Tour, in his family owned No. 76 at Thompson Motorsports Park. He started 18th and, crashed out of the event finishing 24th. Since 2003, Blewett decided to return to Wall Stadium full time and, return to his former graces. Blewett captured six main events at Wall, those victories includes the Garden State Classic and the Woody's 105. Not only winning six races, he won his third Wall Stadium Modified Championship since 2002. During the 2017 season, he ran two dirt races at New Egypt Speedway after a two year absence in the Lou Cicconi machine renumbered 76. At the Sunoco World Series 150 at Thompson, Blewett qualified 9th and finished 19th in the final rundown. Blewett also won the Spooky Spectacular.

Blewett raced the 44th annual season ending Turkey Derby; he raced five divisions. Timed third in the Sportsman and, finished sixth. Timed second in the Late Model and won. He swept the Tour Modified and SK Modified and, he lost his quest on a three peat in the Dirt Modified after a blown engine.

Motorsports career results

NASCAR
(key) (Bold – Pole position awarded by qualifying time. Italics – Pole position earned by points standings or practice time. * – Most laps led.)

Whelen Modified Tour

References

External links
 

NASCAR drivers
Living people
1980 births
Place of birth missing (living people)